Verl Thomas Lillywhite (December 5, 1926 – July 14, 2007) was an American football halfback who played four seasons with the San Francisco 49ers. He first enrolled at Modesto Junior College before transferring to the University of Southern California. He attended Inglewood High School in Inglewood, California. Lillywhite served in the United States Navy during the Korean War.

References

External links
Just Sports Stats

1926 births
2007 deaths
Players of American football from Utah
American football halfbacks
Modesto Pirates football players
USC Trojans football players
San Francisco 49ers players
People from Garland, Utah
United States Navy personnel of the Korean War
Inglewood High School (California) alumni
Players of American football from Inglewood, California